Mokbul Hossain or Makbul Hossain may refer to:

 Makbul Hossain, Bangladeshi businessman, politician and Member of Parliament from Dhaka-9
 Makbul Hossain (politician), politician of Chuadanga District of Bangladesh and Member of Parliament from Chuadanga-1
 Mokbul Hossain (Pabna politician), politician of Pabna District of Bangladesh and Member of Parliament from Pabna-2
 M Makbul Hossain, Bangladeshi Navy officer
 Md. Mokbul Hossain, politician of Pabna District of Bangladesh and Member of Parliament from Pabna-3
 Md. Mokbul Hossain (Meherpur politician), Member of Parliament from Meherpur-2